Arthur's Knights II: The Secret of Merlin is a 2001 adventure video game, developed by Cryo Interactive and published by Wanadoo Edition. Arthur's Knights II: The Secret of Merlin follows 2000's Arthur's Knights: Tales of Chivalry. The player takes the role of a knight of King Arthur.

Reception

References

External links

Arthur's Knights II: The Secret of Merlin at Microïds 
Arthur's Knights II: The Secret of Merlin at GameFAQs

2002 video games
Adventure games
Cryo Interactive games
Fantasy video games set in the Middle Ages
North America-exclusive video games
Role-playing video games
Video games based on Arthurian legend
Video games based on Celtic mythology
Video games developed in France
Windows-only games
Windows games